Jack Smith (born 27 December 1994) is a Scottish footballer who plays as a striker for Bo'ness United.

He previously played for St Mirren, East Fife, Greenock Morton, Arbroath, East Kilbride, Stenhousemuir, BSC Glasgow, Spartans, Caledonian Braves, and Drumchapel United.

Career

Smith started his career with St Mirren, making two brief appearances as a substitute in the 2012–13 Scottish Premier League before signing for East Fife in 2013. After a trial match plus three other appearances for the Fifers, Smith signed for Greenock Morton's development squad in January 2014. He made his debut on 22 February as a substitute against Alloa Athletic. He was released at the end of the 2013–14 season.

After his release by Morton, Smith signed for Arbroath until May 2015, only making four starts in a full season. He subsequently signed for Lowland League side, East Kilbride in August 2015.

After impressing for East Kilbride, Smith was signed by Scottish League One side Stenhousemuir in June 2016. In November 2016, Smith returned to East Kilbride on a short-term loan. Smith only lasted twelve months with the Ochilview side, and was released at the end of the 2016–17 season.

After a season with BSC Glasgow in the Lowland League, On 25 June 2018 Smith moved, within the division to the reigning champions Spartans.

Smith decided to leave Spartans in May 2020 to play football closer to home and later signed for Caledonian Braves in July 2020.

Drumchapel United announced the signing of Smith on 29 May 2021.

Smith signed with Bo'ness United in February 2022.

Personal life
Smith is the son of former Dunfermline Athletic and Airdrieonians striker Andy Smith.

References

External links

 

1994 births
Living people
Footballers from Bellshill
Scottish footballers
Association football forwards
St Mirren F.C. players
East Fife F.C. players
Greenock Morton F.C. players
Arbroath F.C. players
Stenhousemuir F.C. players
East Kilbride F.C. players
Scottish Professional Football League players
Scottish Premier League players
Lowland Football League players
Broomhill F.C. (Scotland) players
Spartans F.C. players